Brady Cook (born October 12, 2001) is an American football quarterback for the Missouri Tigers.

High school career 
Cook attended Chaminade College Preparatory School in Creve Coeur, Missouri. As a senior, Cook threw for 33 touchdowns and 3,194 yards. Cook was rated as a three-star recruit and the number one quarterback in Missouri, and committed to play college football at University of Missouri.

College career 
In 2020, Cook would redshirt and appear in three games. Cook would record 72 yards passing and one touchdown. Cook entered the 2021 season as the backup to Connor Bazelak. After Bazelak would struggle and eventually get injured, Cook would receive his first major playing time against Georgia. Cook would throw for 78 yards in a 43-6 loss. Cook would make his first career start against Army in the 2021 Armed Forces Bowl. Cook would tally 238 passing yards and a touchdown while rushing for 53 yards and a touchdown. Entering the 2022 season, Cook would be named the starting quarterback. Cook would lead Missouri to a 2-2 start including a three touchdown performance against Abilene Christian. Cook would then lead Missouri to a 22-12 lead over No. 1 Georgia in the fourth quarter. Despite this, Georgia would score 14 unanswered points to win 26-22. Cook would finish the game with 192 yards and a touchdown.

Statistics

Personal life 
Cook is the son of Jim and Amy Cook and he grew up a fan of the Missouri Tigers. Cook was named to the 2021 SEC Academic Honor Roll.

References

External links 

 Missouri Tigers bio

Living people
Missouri Tigers football players
American football quarterbacks
Players of American football from St. Louis
Chaminade College Preparatory School (Missouri) alumni
2001 births